In the Wind is an LP album by Jackie DeShannon, released by Imperial Records under catalog number LP-9296 as a monophonic recording in 1965, and later in stereo under catalog number LP-12296 the same year.

Track listing

1965 albums
Jackie DeShannon albums
Albums arranged by Jack Nitzsche
Imperial Records albums